Konalga is a village in the Baskil District of Elazığ Province in Turkey. The village is populated by Kurds of the Herdî tribe and had a population of 127 in 2021.

The hamlets of Direkli, Güllübal, Hacıyusuf, Korucu, Ovacık, Özbaşı, Pekmezli, Sal, Uğurlu, Ulucak, Üçkonak, Üzümlü and Yağmurlu are attached to the village.

References

Villages in Baskil District
Kurdish settlements in Elazığ Province